House Resolution 2600 (The Pediatric Acquired Brain Injury Plan Act) is a bill in the United States House of Representatives that was introduced on July 20, 2011 by Rep. Leonard Lance [NJ-7].  It currently has over 130 co-sponsors as of August 14, 2012.

Overview 
The bill requires the Secretary of Health and Human Services (HHS) to make a payment for each fiscal year from FY2012-FY2018 to the State Lead Center in each state for implementation of the National Acquired Brain Injury Plan.  The PABI Plan was created by the Sarah Jane Brain Foundation’s International Advisory Board and develops a seamless, standardized, evidence-based system of care that is universally accessible for the millions of American families that have a child or young adult suffering from the #1 leading cause of death and disability for our youth: brain injury.

Actions 
HR 2600 was referred to the House Committee on Energy and Commerce on July 20, 2011.  It was then referred to the Subcommittee on Health on July 29, 2011

Bill Text 

SECTION 1. SHORT TITLE.
This Act may be cited as the `National Pediatric Acquired Brain Injury Plan Act of 2011'.

SEC. 2. NATIONAL PEDIATRIC ACQUIRED BRAIN INJURY PLAN.
(a) In General- For each of fiscal years 2012 through 2018, the Secretary shall make a payment to the State Lead Center in each State for implementation of the National Pediatric Acquired Brain Injury Plan.
(b) Amount of Payments- In making payments under subsection (a), the Secretary--
(1) shall allocate amounts among the State Lead Centers consistently with the National Pediatric Acquired Brain Injury Plan; and
(2) if the amounts available to carry out this section for a fiscal year are insufficient to pay the full amounts that all State :Lead Centers are eligible to receive under the National Pediatric Acquired Brain Plan, shall ratably reduce the allocations to the State Lead Centers.
(c) Assurances- As a condition on receipt of a payment under this section, a State Lead Center shall provide such assurances as the Secretary may require to ensure that the payment is used to implement the National Pediatric Acquired Brain Injury Plan.
(d) Annual Report- The Secretary shall submit to the Congress an annual report containing--
(1) an evaluation of all federally funded pediatric acquired brain injury research, clinical care, and institutional, home-based, and community-based programs (including an evaluation of the outcomes of such programs); and
(2) an up-to-date copy of the National Pediatric Acquired Brain Injury Plan.
(e) Definitions- In this section:
(1) The term `National Pediatric Acquired Brain Injury Plan' means the National Pediatric Acquired Brain Injury Plan, as developed by the International Advisory Board of the Sarah Jane Brain Foundation prior to the date of the enactment of this Act and including any revisions or updates to such Plan by the Secretary subsequent to such date of enactment.
(2) The term `pediatric acquired brain injury' means an injury to the developing brain of an individual that--
(A) occurs during the period from birth through 25 years of age; and
(B) is caused by either--
(i) trauma (such as a motor or non-motor vehicle crash, child abuse or abusive head trauma (commonly referred to as `shaken baby syndrome'), a sport-related concussion, a fall, a gun shot wound, a blast injury from war, or being struck by an object); or
(ii) a non-traumatic event (such as a stroke, a brain tumor, meningitis, seizure, ischemia, pediatric AIDS, an infection, poisoning, hypoxia, or encephalopathy).
(3) The term `Secretary' means the Secretary of Health and Human Services.
(4) The term `State' means each of the 50 States, the District of Columbia, and the Commonwealth of Puerto Rico.
(5) The term `State Lead Center' means a State Lead Center of Excellence as defined and designated under the National Pediatric Acquired Brain Injury Plan.
(f) Funding-
(1) IN GENERAL- Out of the discretionary funds available to the Secretary for each of fiscal years 2012 through 2018, the following amounts shall be for carrying out this section--
(A) $380,000,000 for fiscal year 2012;
(B) $632,000,000 for fiscal year 2013;
(C) $632,000,000 for fiscal year 2014;
(D) $505,000,000 for fiscal year 2015;
(E) $379,000,000 for fiscal year 2016;
(F) $253,000,000 for fiscal year 2017; and
(G) $126,000,000 for fiscal year 2018.
(2) RELATION TO OTHER FUNDS- The amount of discretionary funds allocated to carry out this section under paragraph (1) shall be in addition to, not in lieu of, the amount of discretionary funds that would otherwise be used by the Secretary for brain injury-specific programs and activities.
(3) SUNSET- No Federal funds may be obligated to carry out this section for any fiscal year after fiscal year 2018.

References 

Proposed legislation of the 112th United States Congress
United States federal health legislation